I Love My Country (Dutch: Ik hou van Holland) is a Dutch TV program, first aired in the Netherlands on 8 March 2008. A tenth season was aired in late 2012, with an 11th season airing in 2013. Until 2013, two seasons were aired per year on RTL 4.

The show was created by the Dutchman John de Mol (who also created the television formats of Big Brother, Deal or No Deal, and The Voice) and has been sold to at least 25 countries worldwide.

Format 
The series is divided into two teams. Each team, led by its captain, has three members, one in each age-category (20–29, 30–39, 40–49). The teams have to answer multiple questions centered on their own home country, like "What is the capital of...", "When did our country end the war with..." etc. At the end of the program the winning team gets a reward typical for their country of origin, like a bicycle in the Netherlands.

International versions 
 Legend
  Currently airing
  No longer airing
  Upcoming
  Original version

References 

Dutch game shows
Television series by Endemol
Television franchises
2008 Dutch television series debuts